Instant Party! is an album by the Everly Brothers, originally released in 1962. It was recorded in Nashville between August and November 1961, shortly after Both Sides of an Evening and it too failed to chart. There is an exclamation point on the cover art but not in the title as shown on the original label.

Critical reception
The album consisted mainly of older pop tunes, making this release notable in its lack of the duo's normal rock and roll. Allmusic stated in its review: "...much of the playing was impeccable, but also, apart from three exceptions, incredibly boring, something the Everlys had never been before. Instant Party! marked a low point in their artistic fortunes..."

Track listing
Side one
 "Step It Up and Go" (Traditional; credited to Don Everly, Phil Everly under the pseudonym Jimmy Howard) - 1:58
 "Theme From Carnival (Love Makes the World Go 'Round)" (Bob Merrill) - 2:40
 "Jezebel" (Wayne Shanklin) - 2:20
 "True Love" (Cole Porter) - 1:59
 "Bye Bye Blackbird" (Mort Dixon, Ray Henderson) - 3:15
 "When It's Night-Time in Italy It's Wednesday Over Here" (Lew Brown, James Kendis) - 2:00
Side two
"Oh! My Pa-Pa (O Mein Papa)" (Paul Burkhard, Geoffrey Parsons, John Turner) - 2:08
 "Trouble in Mind" (Richard M. Jones) - 2:30
 "Autumn Leaves" (Joseph Kosma, Johnny Mercer, Jacques Prévert) - 2:50
 "Long Lost John" (Adapted by Ike Everly) - 1:49
 "The Party's Over" (Betty Comden, Adolph Green, Jules Styne) - 2:14
 "Ground Hawg" (Adapted by Ike Everly) - 2:02

Personnel
Don Everly – guitar, vocals
Phil Everly – guitar, vocals
Chet Atkins – electric guitar
Hank Garland – electric guitar
Luther Brandon – acoustic guitar
Floyd Chance – bass
Floyd Cramer – piano
Buddy Harman, Jr. – drums
Technical
Ken Whitmore - cover photography

References

External links
Collector's Choice Music reissue liner notes by Richie Unterberger.

1962 albums
The Everly Brothers albums
Warner Records albums